Sagarmatha Zone was one of the fourteen zones of Nepal, comprising six districts, namely, Khotang, Okhaldhunga, Saptari, Siraha, Solukhumbu and Udayapur. Here is district wise List of Monuments which is in the Sagarmatha Zone.

Sagarmatha Zone
 List of monuments in Khotang District 
 List of monuments in Okhaldhunga District 
 List of monuments in Saptari District 
 List of monuments in Siraha District
 List of monuments in Solukhumbu District 
 List of monuments in Udayapur District

References

Sagarmatha Zone
Sagarmatha Zone